Nancy Karen Morgan (born April 1, 1949) is an American actress.

Early life
Morgan is the daughter of Marjorie (née Greenfield) and Samuel A. Morgan. Jr.  She is a niece of John "Red" Morgan, who received the Medal of Honor for his actions during World War II in 1943, events later fictionalized in the movie Twelve O'Clock High.

Career
Morgan starred with Ron Howard in Howard's directorial debut Grand Theft Auto as well as starred with Italian film star Terence Hill in a feature film and European television series based on comic-strip hero Lucky Luke. For many years Morgan and her husband John Ritter co-hosted the national United Cerebral Palsy Telethon together. They also co-starred in television movies The Dreamer of Oz and Heartbeat, and in the feature film Americathon. Morgan also made a guest appearance in Ritter's television series Hooperman.

Personal life
Morgan married actor John Ritter in 1977, and they had three children: Jason (b. 1980), Carly (b. 1982), and Tyler, (b. 1985). Ritter and Morgan divorced in 1996 after nineteen years of marriage.

Filmography

Film

Television

References

External links

1949 births
Actresses from Minneapolis
American film actresses
American television actresses
Living people
21st-century American women